The Surfers Paradise Baseball Club is a baseball club based on the Gold Coast in Queensland, that participates in the Greater Brisbane League, Gold Coast and Far North Coast competitions. The club was also host of the 2008 Pan Pacific Masters Games.

History
John Carpenter, Mitch Wikum and Steve Meeham founded Surfers Paradise Baseball Club in 1987. That year the club entered three teams in the Brisbane metropolitan competition, and in their first season won the A-Grade title. This was achieved through the assistance of ex-Claxton Shield players from other states including: Larry Montgomery (NSW), Gary Coward (SA), Lance Wegner (VIC), as well as other quality players from around the Gold Coast and Brisbane region.

The idea for a junior competition on the Gold Coast, or at least Surfers Paradise, was initiated by Steve Meeham who advertised in the local paper for junior players. With mixed responses from players of all age groups, the competition attracted 60 kids between the ages of 10 and 14 years plus one father - Gary Edwards. With Gary's help, Steve split up the children into 5 equal sides, and rolled out a competition on Saturday mornings.

The five junior sides - Giants, Dodgers, Dragons, Reds and Sharks – attracted great success in the '88 to '89 season, and by the '89 to '90 season the number of kids playing baseball at Surfers Paradise had doubled. By the start of the '90 to '91 season, there was an abundance of young players with not enough coaches to manage them so the competition was forced to expand and teams were created in the areas where the kids lived such as Runaway Bay, Nerang and Palm Beach.

The first junior representative players to come from Surfers Paradise were Brandon Pollard, Trent Durrington, Shane Edwards and Adam Wardrop. All four boys were selected in the QLD U/16's squad in 1990 with each of them progressing to more senior representative teams over the years including National and Junior selection, as well as Australian Senior team selection for Trent and Brandon. Trent now runs a Training With the Pro's program out of the club every year in December.

On 21 December 2008 the team played in the Commissioners Cup at the Beenleigh Hawks baseball club and lost to the shield's incumbent, the Redcliffe Padres 4–3.

Notable players
 Trent Durrington (California Angels)
 Wayne Ough (New York Mets)
 Andrew Utting (Baltimore Orioles)
 Matthew Gahan (New York Mets)

Managers
 Kevin Fenn (2019–present)
 Matt Corbitt (2017–2019)
 Jake McMaster (2016-2017)
 Jon Deeble (2015-2016)
 Peter Yates (2010-2015)
 Adam Wardrop (2002-2010)

Presidents
 Tony McPhail (2020–present)
 Justine White (2019–2020)
 Tony McPhail (1996-2019)
 TBC (1987-1999)

Life Members
 John Carpenter
 Judy Carpenter
 Ken Hussey
 Cherie Bombell
 Ron Bombell
 Frits Weber
 Garry Edwards
 Gordon Wallace
 Tony McPhail
 Leigh McPhail
 Col Carruthers
 Lindsay "Butch" Graham
 Bette Holland
 Adam Wardrop
 David Counter
 Mikael Weber
 Connie Stoyakovich
 Matt Studeman

References

External links
Surfers Website
Surfers Paradise end of year results - Courier Mail
O'Neill, R (27 November 2008.) Hawks lack edge  Albert & Logan News
Fielmich, L (3 November 2008.) Masters baseball throws Brassington a slow ball. Gold Coast Bulletin

Australian baseball clubs
Baseball teams in Australia
Surfers Paradise, Queensland
Baseball teams established in 1987
Sporting teams based on the Gold Coast, Queensland
Greater Brisbane League